Pentelicus may refer to:
 Pentelicus Mountain, a tall mountain and mountain range situated northeast of Athens and southwest of Marathon
 Pentelicus (horse), a horse winner of the Mayflower Stakes in 1986
 Pentelicus (wasp), a wasp genus in the subfamily Encyrtinae